Lisa Ek (born 15 September 1982) is a Swedish former football midfielder who last played for Fiorentina. She has also played for AIK Fotboll, Hammarby IF, FC Rosengård and Kopparbergs/Göteborg FC of the Damallsvenskan. The 2011-12 season marked her Champions League debut.

In September 2012 Ek suffered an anterior cruciate ligament injury, ruling her out of action for at least six months.

Ek has been an under-19 international. She is also an accomplished bandy and ice hockey player. In 2013 her partner was male lower division footballer Per Broberg.

Ek retired from football in 2016, after spending a season in Italy playing for Fiorentina. She intended to remain in Italy having become romantically attached to an Italian boyfriend. She attended UEFA Women's Euro 2017 as a pundit for Sveriges Television, where she attracted notice for her dyed-blue hairstyle.

References

External links
 
 
 

1982 births
Living people
Swedish women's footballers
FC Rosengård players
Damallsvenskan players
Hammarby Fotboll (women) players
BK Häcken FF players
AIK Fotboll (women) players
Expatriate women's footballers in Italy
Serie A (women's football) players
Women's association football defenders
Swedish expatriate women's footballers
Swedish expatriate sportspeople in Italy
Fiorentina Women's F.C. players